Linn Township is an inactive township in Cedar County, in the U.S. state of Missouri.

Linn Township was established in the 1840s, and named for the linden trees within its borders.

References

Townships in Missouri
Townships in Cedar County, Missouri